Valery Anatolievich Kravchuk (born 1955) is a retired Soviet heavyweight weightlifter. In 1981 he won the Soviet, European and world titles. His brother Sergey is also a retired competitive weightlifter.

References

1955 births
Living people
Soviet male weightlifters
World Weightlifting Championships medalists